Germania was the Roman term for the historical region in north-central Europe initially inhabited mainly by Germanic tribes.

Germania may also refer to:

Arts and culture 
 Germania (band), a project of the Slovenian group Laibach
 Germania (book), a historical and ethnographic work by Tacitus. c. AD 98
 a book on German culture by Simon Winder
 Germania (guild), artisan guilds in the Kingdom of Valencia in Spain
 Germania (opera), a 1902 opera by Alberto Franchetti
 Germania (personification), a figure representing the German Nation or the Germans as whole
 Germania (Philipp Veit), a painting created in 1834–1836
 Germania (St. Paul's Church, Frankfurt am Main), a painting created in 1848
 Germania (stamp), a definitive stamp design from 1900 to 1922 in Germany
 "Germania" (Beethoven), patriotic song by Ludwig van Beethoven
 Germania (German-American culture), aspects of German American culture

Places

Antiquity 
 Germania Antiqua, an abandoned province of the Roman Empire in Europe
 Germania Superior, a province of the Roman Empire in Europe
 Germania Inferior, a province of the Roman Empire in Europe
 Germania in Dacia, a Roman town, current-day Sapareva Banya, Bulgaria
 Germania in Numidia, an ancient city and Roman bishopric, in current-day Algeria

Modern

United States
 Germania, Michigan
 Germania Township, Todd County, Minnesota
 Germania, Missouri
 Germania, New Jersey
 Germania, Texas
 Germania, Wisconsin
 Germania, Iron County, Wisconsin
 Germania, Marquette County, Wisconsin
 Germania, Wyoming

Elsewhere
 Germania (city), the projected renewal of Berlin, Germany during the Nazi period
 Germania, Ontario, Canada
 Germania District, Siquirres Canton, Costa Rica
 Germania Land, Greenland
 Germania, Djursholm, Sweden

Sports

German football clubs
 BFC Germania 1888, from Berlin
 Germania Bieber
 Germania Bietigheim (disambiguation)
 Germania Bochum, defunct
 SC Germania 1899 Bremen, defunct 
 Germania Breslau, defunct 
 Germania Brötzingen
 1. FC Germania Egestorf/Langreder
 VfL Germania 1894, from Frankfurt am Main
 FC Germania Friedrichstal
 VfB Germania Halberstadt
 Germania Kattowitz, defunct
 Mannheimer FG Germania 1897, defunct 
 FC Germania 1899 Mühlhausen, now SV 1899 Mühlhausen 
 1. FC Germania 08 Ober-Roden
 DFC Germania Prag, defunct 
 SV Germania Schöneiche
 FC Germania 06 Schwanheim
 Germania Teveren
 SG Germania Wiesbaden
 TSV Germania Windeck

Other uses in sports
 FC Germania Helsinki, a sports club in Finland
 SC Germânia, now Esporte Clube Pinheiros, in São Paulo, Brazil
 SC Germania List, a German rugby union club
 Germania F.V., a defunct Mexican football club
 Germania Königshütte, a former German football club, now Polish club AKS Chorzów

Transportation 
 Germania (ship), 1869–1891
 Germania (yacht), 1908–1930
 , a number of steamships with this name
 , a German trawler in service 1934–39 and as the vorpostenboot V 403 Germania and V 410 Germania 1939–44

 Germania (airline), a defunct German airline
 Germania Flug, now Chair Airlines, a Swiss airline

Other uses
 Germanía, the argot used by criminals or in jails in Spain during 15th and 16th centuries
 Germania Flugzeugwerke, a German aircraft manufacturer during World War I
 Germania C.I
 Germania C.IV
 Germanium dioxide or Germania, an inorganic compound
 Friedrich Krupp Germaniawerft (or Germaniawerft, 'Germania shipyard'), a former German shipbuilding company
 5th SS Panzer Division "Wiking", originally SS-Division Germania
 241 Germania, a main-belt asteroid

See also 

 Germania Building (disambiguation)
 Germanic (disambiguation)
 Germany (disambiguation)
 Germanicopolis (disambiguation)
 Germanicia, now Kahramanmaraş in Turkey
 Germaniciana, now in Tunisia
 Germanium, a chemical element